Robert Burke may refer to:
Robert Burke (director) (born 1984), American film director
Robert John Burke (born 1960), American actor who starred in Robocop 3
Robert C. Burke (1949–1968), Medal of Honor recipient and United States Marine, killed in action in Vietnam
Robert Malachy Burke (1907–1998), Irish Christian socialist and philanthropist
Robert E. Burke (1847–1901), U.S. Representative from Texas
Robert O'Hara Burke (1821–1861), Australian explorer
Robert Burke, in list of characters in Jurassic Park
Robert H. Burke (1922–2003), American politician in California
Robert P. Burke (born 1961), United States Navy admiral
Robert Easton (actor) (Robert Burke, 1930–2011), American actor

See also 
Robert Bourke, 1st Baron Connemara (1827–1902), British Conservative politician and colonial administrator